The Hatsushima class is a class of coastal minesweepers of the Japan Maritime Self-Defense Force.

Development 
The Maritime Self-Defense Force has introduced the mine sweeping capability of the Takami class minesweeper developed in the 3rd Defense Build-up Plan by installing the British ASDIC 193 and the ZQS-2 mine detector that introduced the technology. However, in minesweepers such as the same class, immediately after the introduction of mine sweeping technology, mine disposal depended on the underwater diver, and the danger was great.

For this reason, it has become necessary to reduce the risk of mine clearance by using a self-propelled / precursor-type mine disposal tool that is remotely controlled. In response to this, the medium-sized minesweeper in the 4th Defense Build-up Plan was to further improve its sweeping ability, and this type was built by this.

Ships in the class

Citations 

Ships built in Japan
Minesweepers of the Japan Maritime Self-Defense Force